Mozart Monument. Mozart Memorial or Mozartdenkmal may refer to a number of monuments to Wolfgang Amadeus Mozart:

the Mozart Monument (Vienna), in the Austrian city of Vienna where Mozart spent much of his life
the Mozart Monument (Salzburg), in the Austrian city of Salzburg where Mozart was born
the Mozart Monument (Baku), in the Azerbaijani city of Baku
the Beethoven–Haydn–Mozart Memorial, in the German city of Berlin